
Gmina Grajewo is an urban settlement in Grajewo County, Podlaskie Voivodeship, in north-eastern Poland. Its seat is the city of Grajewo although the city is part of the commune.

Villages
Gmina Grajewo contains the villages and settlements of Białaszewo, Białaszewo-Kolonia, Białogrądy, Białogrądy-Kolonia, Boczki-Świdrowo, Brzozowa, Brzozowa Wólka, Chojnówek, Ciemnoszyje, Cyprki, Danówek, Dybła, Elżbiecin, Flesze, Gackie, Godlewo, Grozimy, Kacprowo, Kapice, Kolonie Sojczyn Borowy, Konopki, Konopki-Kolonie, Koszarówka, Koty-Rybno, Kurejewka, Kurejwa, Kurki, Łamane Grądy, Łękowo, Lipińskie, Lipnik, Łojki, Łosewo, Mareckie, Mierucie, Modzele, Okół, Pieniążki, Podlasek, Popowo, Ruda, Sienickie, Sikora, Sojczyn Borowy, Sojczyn Grądowy, Sojczynek, Szymany, Szymany-Kolonie, Toczyłowo, Uścianki, Wierzbowo, Wojewodzin and Zaborowo.

Neighbouring gminas
Gmina Grajewo is bordered by the gminas of Goniądz, Prostki, Radziłów, Rajgród, Szczuczyn and Wąsosz.

References

Polish official population figures 2006

Grajewo
Grajewo County